Ben Phillips may refer to:

 Ben Phillips (poet) (born 1947), Canadian poet, teacher and publisher
 Ben Phillips (rugby union) (born 1981), Welsh rugby union footballer
 Ben Phillips (cricketer) (born 1974), English cricketer
 Benny Phillips (born 1960), English football player and manager
 Ben Phillips, guitarist for American rock band The Pretty Reckless
 Ben Phillips (YouTuber) (born 1992), British YouTuber and comedian
 Ben Phillips, Australian writer of Diary of an Uber Driver blog and e-book
 Benjamin F. Phillips, American politician